Sloanea assamica is a species of plant in the Elaeocarpaceae family. It is found in Bhutan, China, India, and Myanmar.

References

assamica
Least concern plants
Taxonomy articles created by Polbot